Zoulehia Abzetta Dabonne (born 15 December 1992) is an Ivory Coast judoka. At the 2016 Summer Olympics she competed in the Women's -57 kg. At the 2020 Summer Olympics, she competed in the women's 57 kg event.

In 2021, she  won one of the bronze medals in her event at the 2021 African Judo Championships held in Dakar, Senegal.

References

External links
 

Olympic judoka of Ivory Coast
1992 births
Judoka at the 2016 Summer Olympics
Living people
Ivorian female judoka
African Games silver medalists for Ivory Coast
African Games medalists in judo
Competitors at the 2015 African Games
Judoka at the 2020 Summer Olympics